HD 179079 is a star with an exoplanetary companion in the equatorial constellation of Aquila. It has an apparent visual magnitude of approximately 7.96, making it too faint to be readily visible to the naked eye. The distance to this star can be determine using parallax measurements, which yields an estimate of approximately 228 light years. It is drifting further away with a radial velocity of +20 km/s.

This is an evolved G-type subgiant star with a stellar classification of G5IV. It is nearly 7–8 billion years old and is chromospherically inactive with a projected rotational velocity of 1 km/s. The evolutionary track for this star implies a mass slightly higher than the Sun. It is larger in radius than the Sun and has a higher metallicity; the abundance of elements in the star's atmosphere with higher atomic numbers than hydrogen and helium. HD 179079 is radiating about 2.3 times the luminosity of the Sun from its photosphere at an effective temperature of 5,672 K.

Planetary system
An exoplanet, HD 179079 b, was announced in August 2009 to be orbiting this star. The planet was detected by the radial velocity method, using the HIRES spectrometer at Keck Observatory.

See also
 HD 73534
 List of extrasolar planets

References

G-type subgiants
Planetary systems with one confirmed planet
Aquila (constellation)
Durchmusterung objects
179079
094256